Ghaslo  Ki Dhani is a village of Kishangarh tahsil, Ajmer district, Rajasthan, India.

References 

Villages in Ajmer district